Yelena Anatolyevna Churakova (born December 16, 1986) is a Russian track and field athlete who specialises in the 400 metres hurdles. She participated in the 2012 Olympics, reaching a semifinal.

In January 2013, she tested positive for testosterone and on April 2 was disqualified for two years.

International competitions

References

External links

1986 births
Living people
Russian female hurdlers
Olympic athletes of Russia
Athletes (track and field) at the 2012 Summer Olympics
World Athletics Championships athletes for Russia
Doping cases in athletics
Russian sportspeople in doping cases